Charles Owen Leaver Riley (26 May 1854 – 23 June 1929) was the first Anglican Archbishop of Perth, Western Australia.

Early years
Riley was born in Birmingham, Warwickshire, England, the eldest child of the Reverend Lawrence William Riley, vicar of St Cross, Knutsford, England, and his wife Emma, née Shaw. Riley was educated at Heversham Grammar School and Owen's College, Manchester, and Caius College, Cambridge, where he graduated B.A. in 1878, M.A. in 1881, and was given the honorary degree of D.D. in 1894. He was ordained deacon in 1878 and priest in 1879, and was curate at East Bierley, Yorkshire from 1878 to 1880, Bradford from 1880 to 1882, and Lancaster from 1882 to 1885.   He became vicar of St Paul's, Preston, in 1885, a position he held for nine years.

Archbishop of Perth
He was consecrated by the Archbishop of Canterbury at Westminster Abbey on 18 October 1894.

Riley arrived in Western Australia on 3 February 1895 and found that the diocese had few clergy, little money, and poor means for organizing religious services for the now rapidly increasing population - due largely to the gold rush. He was young and vigorous and quickly made himself acquainted with large areas of his diocese. It was realised that the diocese must be subdivided, but it was not until 1904 that it was found possible to establish the diocese of Bunbury. Other dioceses were subsequently founded in the north-west and the eastern goldfields, and Riley became archbishop of Perth in 1914. With many difficulties Guildford Grammar School was taken over by the Church and firmly established, but frequently came into conflict with Percy Henn, the school headmaster. He was also noted for his close association with Sir John Winthrop Hackett in working for the establishment of the University of Western Australia. He was senior chaplain of the Australian Military Forces in Western Australia in 1913; he became chaplain-general in the same year. Riley toured the UK, France & Egypt for 3½ months in late 1916 early 1917 enquiring into the administration of each theatre's Chaplain's Dept, returning to Australia in February 1917. He was chancellor of the university from 1916 to 1922 and was also president of the trustees of the public library, museum and art gallery at Perth.

Personal life
Riley married Elizabeth Merriman on 7 January 1886; subsequently they had three daughters and three sons. In 1927 one of their sons, Frank Basil Riley, mysteriously disappeared while acting as special correspondent to The Times in China. Riley's usually robust health began to fail and his impending retirement was announced shortly before his death on 23 June 1929. He was survived by his wife and two sons and three daughters. One of the sons, Charles Lawrence Riley (born 1888) subsequently became the Bishop of Bendigo in Victoria.

Riley was active in freemasonry, in both English and Australian jurisdictions. In 1897 in the United Grand Lodge of England he was granted the honorific rank of Past Grand Chaplain in recognition of his services to English Freemasonry, as part of a series of similar honorary promotions intended to mark the diamond jubilee of Queen Victoria. In Australian Freemasonry he is particularly notable as the longest serving Grand Master of the Western Australian Grand Lodge. He held this position from 1904 until his death, with the exception of a three-year term (1917–1920) by Sir William Ellison-Macartney.

References

Further reading

 
 Battye, J. S. The Cyclopedia of Western Australia
 
 
 Wilson, J. G. Western Australia's Centenary; Crockford, 1929.
 The Westralian, 24 and 25 June 1929;

External links

 
 

 

1854 births
1929 deaths
Anglican archbishops of Perth
Alumni of Gonville and Caius College, Cambridge
University of Western Australia chancellors